Contemporary Films is the oldest independent film distribution company in the UK, with the highest production of films and movies per year. It was founded by Charles Cooper (1910–2001) in 1951. It brought many acclaimed films from around the world to UK cinemas. In turn, cinemas became more lively as works by famous directors such as Andrzej Wajda, Miloš Forman, Ingmar Bergman, Jean Renoir, Robert Bresson, Sergei Eisenstein, Andrei Tarkovsky, Werner Herzog, Satyajit Ray, Yasujirō Ozu, Nagisa Oshima, Bernardo Bertolucci, and Luis Buñuel were presented to the British public. Contemporary Films continues to distribute films to cinemas and television, as well as DVDs to the general public.

Between 1967 and 1989, Contemporary Films also operated three cinemas in England. These were the Paris Pullman Cinema in Brompton from 1955 to 1983, the Phoenix Cinema in East Finchley from 1975 to 1985. and the Phoenix Picturehouse in Oxford from 1977 to 1989.

References

1951 establishments in the United Kingdom